Cyclothone braueri, commonly known as the garrick, is a species of ray-finned fish in the genus Cyclothone.

References

Gonostomatidae
Fish described in 1926
Taxa named by Åge Vedel Tåning